Lard Khazan (also Romanized as Lard Khazān) is a village in Rahgan Rural District, Khafr District, Jahrom County, Fars Province, Iran. At the 2006 census, its population was 329, in 81 families.

References 

Populated places in  Jahrom County